The  is an annual men's marathon race that takes place every February between the cities of Beppu and Ōita on the island of Kyushu in Japan. The race has IAAF Silver Label Road Race status and is a listed course of AIMS (Association of International Marathons).

Course History
First held in 1952 as a 35 km race, the looped marathon course begins at the bottom of Takasaki Mountain and reaches Beppu's Kankoko International Port before turning back towards the finishing point in the Ōita Municipal Athletic Stadium. The event is sponsored by The Mainichi Newspapers Co. and is formally known as the Beppu-Ōita Mainichi Marathon. It hosted the Asian Marathon Championship in 1994.

The course is AIMS-certified which means that performances on the course are eligible for national and world records. The course has historically provided fast times: in 1963 Tōru Terasawa's time of 2:15:15.8 was recognised as the marathon world best and fifteen years later Shigeru Sō brought the course its second world best with his winning time of 2:09:05.6 in 1978. Furthermore, Koichi Morishita's win in 1991 was the fastest time recorded that year. Gert Thys of South Africa won the race in 1996 with a time of 2:08:30 and his mark stood for seventeen years until Yuki Kawauchi completed the course in 2:08:15 in 2013.

The marathon race attracts approximately 500 entrants each year, of whom around two-thirds finish the course. The large majority of the runners are Japanese, or Japanese-based. A small number of international athletes are invited to compete each year, although other foreign athletes also appear in the race for pace setting purposes. An additional road race, the Beppu-Oita Mainichi Half Marathon, was held in conjunction with the main race between 1976 and 2001.

Past winners
Key:

Statistics

Winners by country

Multiple winners

Notes

References
General
Beppu-Oita Mainichi Marathon. ARRS (2009-12-24). Retrieved on 2010-02-08.
Specific

External links
Official website

Marathons in Japan
Recurring sporting events established in 1952
Sport in Ōita Prefecture
Tourist attractions in Ōita Prefecture
Men's marathons
Annual sporting events in Japan
1952 establishments in Japan